Bernard Desjean, Baron de Pointis (7 October 1645 – 24 April 1707) was a French admiral and privateer.

Pointis was born in Brittany.  He took part in naval operations in the 1680s under Duquesne, like the bombardment of Algiers and the punitive action against Genoa. In the 1690s he fought under Tourville among others in the Battle of Beachy Head (1690). In 1693, he became chef d'escadre. In 1697, he undertook the Raid on Cartagena. This raid was so successful that it made him immensely rich and very appreciated by King Louis XIV.

In 1689 he is Lieutenant-General of the artillery at the Siege of Derry.

In 1702, after the death of Jean Bart, he was appointed head of the Dunkirkers, but he was soon replaced by Marc-Antoine de Saint-Pol Hécourt for lack of initiative.

In 1705, he tried to attack Gibraltar by sea during the Twelfth Siege of Gibraltar, but was defeated by John Leake in the Battle of Cabrita Point. After this battle Pointis retired from active service.

He published Relation de l'expédition de Carthègene faite par les François en 1697.  He died in Paris in 1707.

References

Further reading
Konstam, Angus and Roger Michael Kean. Pirates - Predators of the Seas: An Illustrated History. New York: Skyhorse Publishing Inc., 2007. 

1645 births
1707 deaths
French pirates
French Navy admirals
French naval commanders in the War of the Spanish Succession
French military personnel of the Nine Years' War